The 2007–08 Biathlon World Cup – World Cup 1 was the opening event of the season and was held in Kontiolahti, Finland, from November 29 until December 2, 2007.

Schedule of events

Medal winners

Men

Women

References

1
2007 in Finnish sport
World Cup - World Cup 1,2007-08
November 2007 sports events in Europe
December 2007 sports events in Europe
Kontiolahti